Arterton is an English surname. Notable people with the surname include:

Gemma Arterton (born 1986), English actress, activist, and film producer
Hannah Arterton (born 1989), English actress, sister of Gemma

English-language surnames